Florian Wenninger (born 5 July 1978, in Oberndorf bei Salzburg) is an Austrian historian, dedicating himself mainly to the history of totalitarian regimes in the 20th century.

From 2008 to 2013, Wenninger was a scientific assistant professor at the Institut für Zeitgeschichte of the University of Vienna. He is the editor of four volumes on the contemporary history of Austria, he published a series of scientific articles and serves as a coordinator of the project "". In addition, he serves as a staff member of the scientific periodical zeitgeschichte. Until 2010, he served as the chairman of the Austrian Holocaust Memorial Service called . He also participates regularly in public debates on contemporary history.

Publications 
As editor of books:
 with Paul Dvorak and Katharina Kuffner: Geschichte macht Herrschaft. Zur Politik mit dem Vergangenen, Verlag Braumüller, Wien 2007
 with Peter Pirker: Wehrmachtsjustiz. Kontext – Praxis – Nachwirkungen, Wien 2011
 with Lucile Dreidemy: Das Dollfuß/Schuschnigg-Regime 1933–1938. Vermessung eines Forschungsfeldes, Böhlau Verlag, Wien-Köln-Weimar 2013

Major articles in books and magazines:
 "Geschichte zwischen 'Aufarbeitung' und Vermittlung. Überlegungen anhand eines Exempels", In: Bundesjugendvertrung (Hg.) 2010: Geraubte Kindheit. Kinder und Jugendliche im Nationalsozialismus, Wien, pp. 197–212.
 "Die Wohnung des Rottenführers D. Über Opferfokus und Täterabsenz in der zeitgeschichtlichen Vermittlungsarbeit". In: Hilmar, Till (Hg.) 2010: Ort, Subjekt, Verbrechen. Koordinaten historisch-politischer Bildungsarbeit zum Nationalsozialismus, Wien, pp. 54–74.
 "Projektarbeit und externe Kooperationen in der historisch-politischen Bildungsarbeit mit Jugendlichen. Ein Werkstattbericht des Vereins Gedenkdienst", In: Jahrbuch 2010, Dokumentationsarchiv des österreichischen Widerstandes, pp. 66–88.
 "Aus Zeitgeschichte wird Geschichte. Zu Möglichkeiten und Grenzen der Arbeit mit Jugendlichen in der KZ-Gedenkstätte Mauthausen". In: Bauer, Christa/Baumgartner, Andreas/Mernyi, Willi (Hg.) 2009: Nichts als alte Mauern. Sinn und Möglichkeiten von KZ-Gedenkstättenbesuchen und Dokumentation eines erfolgreichen Modellprojektes, vol. 1, pp. 15–26.
 "Zwischen Verantwortung, Schuld und Sühne. Der österreichische Gedenkdienst und die deutsche Aktion Sühnezeichen als Formen nichtstaatlicher Geschichtspolitik". In: Austriaca, December 2009, No. 69, pp. 87–112.
 "Der Bürgerkrieg in den Köpfen. Die Deutungsmuster der sozialdemokratischen Führung nach der Niederlage im Februar 1934". In: Juridikum 01/2009, pp. 44–47.
 "Februarerinnerung. Der österreichische Bürgerkrieg im historischen Gedächtnis der Zweiten Republik". In: Kienesberger, Klaus et alii (Hg.): unSICHTBAR. Widerständiges im Salzkammergut, Wien, pp. 68–81
 "Die Rettung des Vaterlandes oder vom Wesen der 'Reinen Demokratie'". In: Betrifft Widerstand, Nr. 87, Juni 2008, pp. 4–10
 "Nachbarliche Raubzüge – die 'Arisierungen' im 15. Bezirk". In: Kofler, Michael/ Pühringer, Judith/Traska, Georg 2008: Das Dreieck meiner Kindheit. Eine jüdische Vorstadtgemeinde in Wien, Wien, pp. 148–169.

Sources 

21st-century Austrian historians
Writers from Salzburg
1978 births
Living people